High on the Hog may refer to:
 High on the Hog (The Band album), 1996
 High on the Hog (Black Oak Arkansas album), 1973
 High on the Hog (Kevin Fowler album), 2002
 High on the Hog: A Culinary Journey from Africa to America, 2011 book by Jessica Harris
 High on the Hog: How African American Cuisine Transformed America, 2021 Netflix docu-series on  based on High on the Hog: A Culinary Journey from Africa to America